Eudryas brevipennis is a moth in the family Noctuidae. It is found in Idaho, Utah and California. The habitat consists of wetlands.

The length of the forewings is 14–16 mm. The forewings are white and the hindwings are bright yellow. Both are edged in red-brown. Adults are on wing in summer.

The larvae feed on Oenothera and Epilobium species.

Subspecies
Eudryas brevipennis brevipennis
Eudryas brevipennis bonneville Shepard & Crabo, 2013 (Idaho)

References

Moths described in 1872
Agaristinae